T. N. Seema ഡോ . ടി .എൻ സീമ  (born 1 June 1963) is an Indian social worker, teacher, and politician who was an MP from Rajya Sabha elected from Kerala from 2010 to 2016 for the Communist Party of India (Marxist).

Early life and education
Seema was born on 1 June 1963 in Thrissur in the Indian state of Kerala.

She married G. Jayaraj on 23 December 1986, who is the current director of C-DIT appointed by the state government. She has one daughter.

T N Seema is also the Kerala State President and National Vice President AIDWA,  and the State Committee Member of CPI(M) in Kerala.

Career
Seema was elected to Rajya Sabha in April 2010. As an upper house member, she was in the Standing Committee on Food, Consumer Affairs and Public Distribution, Member, Consultative Committee for the Ministry of Civil Aviation, Member, Committee on Empowerment of Women, Committee on office of profit, Member, Consultative Committee on Zonal Railway Users, Southern Railways.

She has been an editor of a women's monthly, "Sthreesabdam" as a member of State Executive Committee of Kudumbashree Poverty Alleviations Mission, Kerala.

She serves as chairperson of the Haritha Keralam mission and in 2020, was made CPM's mayor candidate in Thiruvananthapuram.

References

1963 births
Living people
Communist Party of India (Marxist) politicians from Kerala
Indian feminist writers
Indian atheists
Indian women activists
Indian women's rights activists
Indian Marxist writers
Women in Kerala politics
University of Kerala alumni
Rajya Sabha members from Kerala
Politicians from Thrissur
Journalists from Kerala
Indian political writers
Indian women political writers
20th-century Indian women writers
20th-century Indian journalists
20th-century Indian educators
21st-century Indian women scientists
21st-century Indian scientists
Social workers
21st-century Indian educators
20th-century Indian women scientists
20th-century Indian scientists
Women writers from Kerala
Women scientists from Kerala
Educators from Kerala
21st-century Indian women politicians
21st-century Indian politicians
Women members of the Rajya Sabha
Women educators from Kerala
Social workers from Kerala
20th-century women educators
21st-century women educators